Jämtland County is one of the 29 multi-member constituencies of the Riksdag, the national legislature of Sweden. The constituency was established in 1970 when the Riksdag changed from a bicameral legislature to a unicameral legislature. It is conterminous with the county of Jämtland. The constituency currently elects four of the 349 members of the Riksdag using the open party-list proportional representation electoral system. At the 2022 general election it had 101,363 registered electors.

Electoral system
Jämtland County currently elects four of the 349 members of the Riksdag using the open party-list proportional representation electoral system. Constituency seats are allocated using the modified Sainte-Laguë method. Only parties that that reach the 4% national threshold and parties that receive at least 12% of the vote in the constituency compete for constituency seats. Supplementary leveling seats may also be allocated at the constituency level to parties that reach the 4% national threshold.

Election results

Summary

(Excludes leveling seats)

Detailed

2020s

2022
Results of the 2022 general election held on 11 September 2022:

The following candidates were elected:
 Constituency seats - Josef Fransson (SD), 3 votes; Kalle Olsson (S), 1,852 votes; Saila Quicklund (M), 993 votes; and Anna-Caren Sätherberg (S), 2,238 votes.

2010s

2018
Results of the 2018 general election held on 9 September 2018:

The following candidates were elected:
 Constituency seats - Per Åsling (C), 2,069 votes; Kalle Olsson (S), 2,941 votes; Saila Quicklund (M), 1,632 votes; and Cassandra Sundin (SD), 70 votes.
 Leveling seats - Anna-Caren Sätherberg (S), 1,367 votes.

2014
Results of the 2014 general election held on 14 September 2014:

The following candidates were elected:
 Constituency seats - Per Åsling (C), 2,378 votes; Kalle Olsson (S), 3,523 votes; Saila Quicklund (M), 2,264 votes; and Anna-Caren Sätherberg (S), 2,400 votes.

2010
Results of the 2010 general election held on 19 September 2010:

The following candidates were elected:
 Constituency seats - Per Åsling (C), 3,488 votes; Marie Nordén (S), 3,059 votes; Saila Quicklund (M), 2,023 votes; and Gunnar Sandberg (S), 1,727 votes.

2000s

2006
Results of the 2006 general election held on 17 September 2006:

The following candidates were elected:
 Constituency seats - Berit Andnor (S), 2,277 votes; Per Åsling (C), 2,883 votes; Marie Nordén (S), 1,363 votes; Gunnar Sandberg (S), 1,535 votes; and Ola Sundell (M), 1,686 votes.

2002
Results of the 2002 general election held on 15 September 2002:

The following candidates were elected:
 Constituency seats - Berit Andnor (S), 570 votes; Rune Berglund (S), 1,063 votes; Håkan Larsson (C), 2,652 votes; Camilla Sköld Jansson (V), 1,151 votes; and Margareta Winberg (S), 6,155 votes.
 Leveling seats - Ola Sundell (M), 1,904 votes.

1990s

1998
Results of the 1998 general election held on 20 September 1998:

The following candidates were elected:
 Constituency seats - Rune Berglund (S), 1,072 votes; Erik A. Egervärn (C), 1,846 votes; Camilla Sköld (V), 1,849 votes; Ola Sundell (M), 1,953 votes; and Margareta Winberg (S), 6,015 votes.

1994
Results of the 1994 general election held on 18 September 1994:

1991
Results of the 1991 general election held on 15 September 1991:

1980s

1988
Results of the 1988 general election held on 18 September 1988:

1985
Results of the 1985 general election held on 15 September 1985:

1982
Results of the 1982 general election held on 19 September 1982:

1970s

1979
Results of the 1979 general election held on 16 September 1979:

1976
Results of the 1976 general election held on 19 September 1976:

1973
Results of the 1973 general election held on 16 September 1973:

1970
Results of the 1970 general election held on 20 September 1970:

References

Riksdag constituency
Riksdag constituencies
Riksdag constituencies established in 1970